Sinovuyo Ganto (born 24 July 1987) is a South African professional rugby union player currently playing with the . His regular position is winger or full-back. He is also currently the backline coach at the Free State Cheetahs Academy.

Career

Youth

He also played rugby sevens for Border.

In 2008, he moved to Cape Town to join  and he represented them in the 2008 Under-21 Provincial Championship, but failed to progress any further.

Border Bulldogs

He returned to the East London-based  and was included in their senior squad for the 2010 Currie Cup First Division competition. Ganto scored his first try at first class level in his third match; it proved to be decisive as Border beat the  22–20 in East London. He made a total of eight appearances in a season that saw Border win just three matches to finish in fifth spot, losing out on a semi-final spot.

He was included in university side ' squad that participated in the first edition of the Varsity Shield competition. They didn't have a great start to the competition, finishing in last position with just two victories.

Falcons

For the second half of 2011, Ganto moved to Kempton Park to join the  prior to the 2011 Currie Cup First Division. He also scored a try in the return fixture in Welkom, but this time the Griffons ran out 46–21 winners.

Free State Cheetahs / Boland Cavaliers

References

South African rugby union players
Living people
1987 births
People from Raymond Mhlaba Local Municipality
Rugby union wings
Rugby union fullbacks
Boland Cavaliers players
Border Bulldogs players
Falcons (rugby union) players
Free State Cheetahs players
Rugby union players from the Eastern Cape